International Wildlife Museum is a non profit natural history museum in Tucson, Arizona. It was established in 1988 by C. J. McElroy as an educational program of the Safari Club International Foundation.

Collection 

The museum is a covered 40,000 square foot area and features more than 400 species of birds, insects and mammals. Some of the collection of the museum is more than 100 years old and were donated by government agencies, rehabilitation centers and captive breeding programs. The taxidermy displays include dioramas and mounted heads. The museum also features the “Big Terror”, a tiger killed in India in 1969,  a rhinoceros taken by President Theodore Roosevelt, the Irish elk with 13 foot antlers, penguins from Richard E. Byrd’s South Pole discovery trip, a passenger pigeon and a wooly mammoth. The museum has been criticized for its amateurishness and out-of-date International Union for Conservation of Nature conservation status ratings.

References 

1988 establishments in Arizona
Natural history museums in Arizona